Sir Thomas Davall (1682-1714), of Burr Street, Wapping, Middlesex, Dovercourt and Gray, Essex, was an English Member of Parliament.

He was the son of Thomas Davall senior. He was a Member (MP) of the Parliament of Great Britain for Harwich 1713 to April 1714.

References

1682 births
1714 deaths
18th-century English people
People from Wapping
Members of the Parliament of Great Britain for Harwich
British MPs 1713–1715